Gilbert Van Manshoven (born 26 May 1946) is a Belgian middle-distance runner. He competed in the men's 800 metres at the 1968 Summer Olympics.

References

1946 births
Living people
Athletes (track and field) at the 1968 Summer Olympics
Belgian male middle-distance runners
Olympic athletes of Belgium
Place of birth missing (living people)